Pirmin Zurbriggen (born 4 February 1963) is a former World Cup alpine ski racer from Switzerland. One of the most successful ski racers ever, he won the overall World Cup title four times, an Olympic gold medal in 1988 in Downhill, and nine World Championships medals (4 gold, 4 silver, 1 bronze).

Biography
Zurbriggen was born in Saas-Almagell in the canton of Valais, the son of Alois, an innkeeper, and Ida. His father competed as a ski racer in local competitions in the 1940s and 1950s, but quit the sport after his brother was killed in a training accident. Zurbriggen made his World Cup debut in January 1981, a month before his 18th birthday. With his victory in the downhill at Kitzbühel in January 1985 at age 21, he became the first to win World Cup races in all five disciplines. (The fifth discipline, Super G, was added in December 1982.) Incidentally Marc Girardelli, the second to enter this exclusive circle, won his first downhill race four years later at the same venue.

Zurbriggen retired from international competition after having won the 1990 World Cup overall title – his fourth, which was then the most overall titles won by a single racer, reached only once before by Gustav Thöni in 1975. Again it was Marc Girardelli who followed him in 1991 with a fourth overall title, and Girardelli added another in 1993 to become the only male racer with five overall titles in World Cup history.

Zurbriggen grew up in the remote village of Saas-Almagell, near Saas-Fee. With a total of 40 World Cup victories over nine years and five gold medals, he belongs to the "All-Time Greats" of alpine skiing, ranking fifth in all-time wins and having 169 Top Ten finishes.

Zurbriggen left the World Cup tour as a hero to start a family; he was married the previous summer (30 June 1989) to Monika Julen (the sister of his best friend on the Swiss ski team, Max Julen), with whom he has five children: Elia, Pirmin Jr., Maria, Alain and Leonie, who have all competed in ski racing.  He is the older brother of Heidi Zurbriggen, a winner of three World Cup downhill races, and a distant cousin of Silvan Zurbriggen.

Zurbriggen now runs the "Wellness Hotel Pirmin Zurbriggen" with his parents in Saas-Almagell and another, "Apparthotel Zurbriggen," in Zermatt. In addition, after his World Cup career had ended he partnered with Authier Ski company on a line of signature skis.

World Cup results

Season standings

Season titles

11 titles (4 overall, 2 DH, 4 SG, 1 GS) plus unofficial 3 K

Race victories
40 wins (10 DH, 10 SG, 7 GS, 11 SC, 2 SL) 
83 podiums (40 wins, 26 second place, 17 third place)

World championship results

Olympic results

See also
Ski World Cup Most podiums & Top 10 results

References

External links 
 
 Pirmin Zurbriggen World Cup standings at the International Ski Federation
 
 

1963 births
Living people
People from Visp (district)
Swiss male alpine skiers
Olympic alpine skiers of Switzerland
Alpine skiers at the 1984 Winter Olympics
Alpine skiers at the 1988 Winter Olympics
Olympic gold medalists for Switzerland
Olympic bronze medalists for Switzerland
Olympic medalists in alpine skiing
FIS Alpine Ski World Cup champions
Medalists at the 1988 Winter Olympics
Recipients of the Olympic Order
Sportspeople from Valais